The Copperbelt Museum is a living museum located in Ndola, Zambia.

References

Museums in Zambia
Ndola
Buildings and structures in Copperbelt Province
Tourist attractions in Copperbelt Province